A number-one ticket holder is a person who holds membership ticket number 1 of a particular sporting club. Possession of the number one ticket is largely symbolic. The tradition of having a number one ticket holder is mainly observed in Australia. The ticket is often given to a celebrity or past sports player in order to raise the profile of the club and publicity.

Australian Football League
The Australian Football League is the premier Australian rules football competition in Australia. Most clubs nominate a single number one ticket holder each year.

National Rugby League
The National Rugby League is the premier rugby league competition in Australasia. Known dates are included in brackets.

A-League
The A-League is a professional men's soccer league in Australia and New Zealand.

ANZ Championship
The ANZ Championship was the premier netball league in Australia and New Zealand that existed between 2008 and 2016.

National Basketball League
The National Basketball League (NBL) is the premier professional basketball league in Australia and New Zealand.

Suncorp Super Netball
Suncorp Super Netball is the premier professional netball league in Australia. The inaugural season commenced in February 2017.

See also

References

Australian rules football culture
1
Tickets
Sport in Australia
Rugby football culture
Sports culture in Australia